Shortcut may refer to:

Navigation
 Rat running or shortcut, a minor-road alternative to a signposted route
 File shortcut, a handle which allows the user to find a file or resource located in a different directory or folder on a computer
 Keyboard shortcut, a combination of keystrokes that provides easier access to a command or operation

Film
 Shortcut (2015 film), a Bollywood film about cybercrime
 Shortcut (2020 film), an Italian horror film
 The Shortcut, a 2009 US film 
 Shortcuts, also known as Cutting It Short, a 1981 film directed by Jirí Menzel

Other uses
 Shortcut (magazine), a Swedish magazine
 Shortcut (software), project management software
 Shortcuts (comics), a syndicated comics page feature
 Shortcuts (app), a scripting application for iOS

See also
 Shortkut, a 2009 Bollywood film
 Short Cut (disambiguation)